Steve Shirreffs (born February 18, 1976) is an American former professional ice hockey forward who played for the Portland Pirates, Hampton Roads Admirals, Kärpät, Cleveland Barons, Reading Royals and Ässät. He was drafted into the National Hockey League by the Calgary Flames in the 1995 NHL Entry Draft. He spent his junior career with Princeton University.

Shirreffs grew up in Norwich, Vermont, and was named one of Sports Illustrateds 50 Greatest Sports Figures from Vermont in 1999.

Awards and honors

Career statistics

References

External links

Living people
Ice hockey people from Vermont
Princeton Tigers men's ice hockey players
Portland Pirates players
Hampton Roads Admirals players
Oulun Kärpät players
Cleveland Barons (2001–2006) players
Reading Royals players
Ässät players
1976 births
Calgary Flames draft picks
American men's ice hockey defensemen
AHCA Division I men's ice hockey All-Americans